Ana Savić (born 9 October 1989 in Požega) is a Croatian former tennis player.

Savić won nine singles titles and one doubles title on the ITF Women's Circuit. On 25 February 2013, she reached her best singles ranking of world No. 222. On 6 October 2014, she peaked at No. 592 in the doubles rankings.

She won her first $50,000 ITF tournament at the 2012 Ankara Cup.

ITF finals (10–5)

Singles (9–4)

Doubles (1–1)

References

External links 
 
 

1989 births
Living people
Tennis players from Split, Croatia
Croatian female tennis players